John of Gaunt's Palace was a late 14th-century merchant's house which stood in the lower part of Lincoln High Street, opposite the St Mary Guildhall. It was progressively demolished from the late 18th century until the 1960s. The very fine oriel window from the building has been preserved in the gatehouse of Lincoln Castle.

History
The palace was initially built by a member of the wealthy Sutton family of Lincoln merchants in  the latter years of the 14th century, on land immediately to the north of St Andrew's church. Research into the history of the building by Sir Francis Hill greatly clarified its early ownership. More recently the study of early drawings and maps by David Stocker has made it possible to reconstruct the layout of the building. Stocker suggested the building was probably built by John of Gaunt's vassal John de Sutton, a wealthy merchant and mayor of Lincoln in 1386. However S.H. Rigby has made out a case that the palace was originally built by Robert Sutton, the brother of John, also a mayor of Lincoln and vassal of Gaunt, who is known to have built a house on the land to the north of St Andrew's Church before 1386.

Architectural History

The house was probably constructed  in the late 14th century, and its form represents a wealthy merchant's town house with a hall and services parallel to the High Street, and an east-west  range to the rear of the street front range which contained the great hall and privy chambers.  There was also a possible lodgings block to the north of the main street front range, which had the arms of John of Gaunt along with other heraldic shields shown above the doors. This  lodging block  may have accommodated John of Gaunt during his visit to Lincoln in 1386.

A drawing by Samuel Hieronymus Grimm shows a building described as the Old Hospital abutting on to the hall range with its two fine late medieval windows. These buildings were on the west side behind  the High Street frontage of the palace. The Hospital building should date from around 1500, and the lozenge-shaped terminals to the doorway and the sunken panels to the spandrels find a very close parallel with the Chancery, in Minster Yard, Lincoln. This is probably the building that Edward James Willson mentions as having been demolished around 1810 and it is not shown on J. S. Padley's survey of Lincoln in 1842.

John of Gaunt's palace was substantially re-built in 1849, becoming an "ordinary-looking stone-built property" which survived until the 1960s, when it was demolished to make way for a garage extension. One of the hall windows, recorded by Edward James Willson,  did survive into the 1940s. A series of stone foundations and walls aligned east-west and north-south were recorded in February 2008, during trial trenching at 116 High Street, Lincoln. It is likely that these relate to John of Gaunt's Palace. The earliest phase of wall construction may represent an earlier building demolished to make way for the merchant's house in the later 14th century. Pottery of 13th-15th century date was recovered.

Colonel Bromhead's House

Grimm also records another building just to the north of the palace which he describes as "Colonel Bromhead's House". This fronts onto the High Street. This is an interesting example of the Lincolnshire Artisan Mannerist style of house building of the mid-17th century. It was built of brick for Alderman Original Peart in 1646, and was one of the earliest examples of brick building in Lincoln. It passed from him to the Bromhead family.

St Andrew's Church, St Andrew's Hall and St Andrew's Cottages
To the south of John of Gaunt's Palace was St Andrew's Church, and to the south of this, over the entrance to Gaunt Street and on the site of the former Lincoln Arms, stood a Norman house known as St Andrew's Hall. Just before its demolition in 1783 it was recorded by Samuel Hieronymus Grimm. His drawing shows that it was very similar to the Jew's House and the Norman House on the Strait and Steep Hill in Lincoln. His drawing also shows that St Andrew's Hall was immediately adjacent to St Andrew's Cottages, which are a row of shops that are still standing. The Grade II* listed Romanesque door arch of St Andrew's Hall, dating from about 1150, salvaged during demolition in 1783, was re-sited in 1907 in the former Lincoln Arms, now Bang and Olufsen. It is situated in a first-floor rear room and is constructed of limestone. The outer arch has a complex double chevron moulding enhanced by an early form of dogtooth moulding.The inner arch has keeled roll moulding flanked by quirks and hollows.

Literature
Exley C.L., and Williamson D.M., (1955), Some notes on St Andrew's Hall, Wigford, Lincoln  Architectural and Archaeological Society,  V0l 6, 118-120.
Hill, J.W.F., (1948), Medieval Lincoln, Cambridge University Press, pp163, 167, & 168.
Rigby S.H., (2000), John of Gaunt’s Palace and the Sutton Family of Lincoln. Lincolnshire History and Archaeology, Vol. 35, pp35–40
Royal Commission on the Historical Monuments of England, (1963), Monuments Threatened or Destroyed, A Select List: 1956-1962.
Stocker, D.A., (1999), A Very Goodly House Longging to Sutton…" A Reconstruction of John of Gaunt's Palace, Lincoln in Lincolnshire History and Archaeology. Vol. 34,
Stocker, D.A., et al (1991).St Mary's Guildhall, Lincoln. The Survey and Excavation of a Medieval Building Complex C.B.A. /City of Lincoln Archaeology Unit:The Archaeology of Lincoln, VolXII-1. 
Stocker D. (ed) (2016), Vernacular Architecture Group, Spring Conference 2016: Lincolnshire, March 29th to April 1st 2016, Society for Lincolnshire History and Archaeology.pp17–18.

See also - Medieval Domestic Architecture in Lincoln
St. Mary's Guildhall, Lincoln
Whitefriars, 333 High Street, Lincoln
Jew's House
Jew's Court

References

External links
 John of Gaunt’s Palace

Ruins in Lincolnshire
Buildings and structures in Lincoln, England
History of Lincoln, England